The 70th United States Congress was a meeting of the legislative branch of the United States federal government, consisting of the United States Senate and the United States House of Representatives. It met in Washington, D.C., from March 4, 1927, to March 4, 1929, during the last two years of Calvin Coolidge's presidency. The apportionment of seats in the House of Representatives was based on the 1910 United States census.

Both chambers had a Republican majority - albeit reduced from the previous Congress - and along with President Coolidge, the Republicans maintained an overall federal government trifecta.

Major events

 November 6, 1928: U.S. Senate elections and U.S. House elections

 This was the last Congress to be exclusively white and the last to not have a single black member of Congress in either chamber.

Major legislation

 March 10, 1928: Settlement of War Claims Act
 May 15, 1928: Flood Control Act of 1928 (Jones–Reid Act)
 May 22, 1928: Merchant Marine Act of 1928 (Jones–White Act)
 May 22, 1928: Forest Research Act (McSweeney–McNary Act)
 May 22, 1928: Capper–Ketcham Act
 May 28, 1928: Welsh Act
 May 29, 1928: Revenue Act of 1928, ch. 852, 
 May 29, 1928: Reed–Jenkins Act
 December 21, 1928: Boulder Canyon Project Act (Hoover Dam)
 December 22, 1928: Color of Title Act
 January 19, 1929: Hawes–Cooper Act
 February 18, 1929: Migratory Bird Conservation Act (Norbeck–Anderson Act), ch. 257, 
 February 25, 1929: Mount Rushmore National Memorial Act (Norbeck-Williamson Act of 1929)
 March 2, 1929: Increased Penalties Act (Jones–Stalker Act)

Party summary

The count below identifies party affiliations at the beginning of the first session of this Congress, and includes members from vacancies and newly admitted states, when they were first seated. Changes resulting from subsequent replacements are shown below in the "Changes in membership" section.

Senate

House of Representatives

Leadership

Senate 
 President: Charles G. Dawes (R)
 President pro tempore: George H. Moses (R)

Majority (Republican) leadership 
 Majority Leader: Charles Curtis
 Majority Whip: Wesley L. Jones
 Republican Conference Secretary:  Frederick Hale
 National Senatorial Committee Chair: Jesse H. Metcalf

Minority (Democratic) leadership 
 Minority leader: Joseph T. Robinson
 Minority whip: Peter G. Gerry
 Democratic Caucus Secretary: Hugo Black

House of Representatives 
 Speaker: Nicholas Longworth (R)

Majority (Republican) leadership 
 Majority Leader: John Q. Tilson
 Majority Whip: Albert Vestal
 Republican Conference Chairman: Willis C. Hawley
 Republican Campaign Committee Chairman: William R. Wood

Minority (Democratic) leadership 
 Minority Leader: Finis J. Garrett
 Minority Whip: William Allan Oldfield
 Democratic Caucus Chairman: Arthur H. Greenwood
 Democratic Campaign Committee Chairman: Joseph W. Byrns Sr.

Members
This list is arranged by chamber, then by state.

Senate

Senators are listed by class.  They were elected every two years, with one-third beginning new six-year terms with each Congress. Preceding the names in the list below are Senate class numbers, which indicate the cycle of their election. In this Congress, Class 1 meant their term ended with this Congress, requiring re-election in 1928; Class 2 meant their term began in the last Congress, requiring re-election in 1930; and Class 3 meant their term began with this Congress, requiring re-election in 1932.

Alabama 
 2. J. Thomas Heflin (D)
 3. Hugo Black (D)

Arizona 
 1. Henry F. Ashurst (D)
 3. Carl Hayden (D)

Arkansas 
 2. Joseph T. Robinson (D)
 3. Thaddeus H. Caraway (D)

California 
 1. Hiram Johnson (R)
 3. Samuel M. Shortridge (R)

Colorado 
 2. Lawrence C. Phipps (R)
 3. Charles W. Waterman (R)

Connecticut 
 1. George P. McLean (R)
 3. Hiram Bingham III (R)

Delaware 
 1. Thomas F. Bayard Jr. (D)
 2. T. Coleman du Pont (R), until December 9, 1928
 Daniel O. Hastings (R), from December 10, 1928

Florida 
 1. Park Trammell (D)
 3. Duncan U. Fletcher (D)

Georgia 
 2. William J. Harris (D)
 3. Walter F. George (D)

Idaho 
 2. William E. Borah (R)
 3. Frank R. Gooding (R), until June 24, 1928
 John W. Thomas (R), from June 30, 1928

Illinois 
 2. Charles S. Deneen (R)
 3. Vacant until December 3, 1928
 Otis F. Glenn (R), from December 3, 1928

Indiana 
 1. Arthur R. Robinson (R)
 3. James E. Watson (R)

Iowa 
 2. Daniel F. Steck (D)
 3. Smith W. Brookhart (R)

Kansas 
 2. Arthur Capper (R)
 3. Charles Curtis (R)

Kentucky 
 2. Frederic M. Sackett (R)
 3. Alben W. Barkley (D)

Louisiana 
 2. Joseph E. Ransdell (D)
 3. Edwin S. Broussard (D)

Maine 
 1. Frederick Hale (R)
 2. Arthur R. Gould (R)

Maryland 
 1. William Cabell Bruce (D)
 3. Millard Tydings (D)

Massachusetts 
 1. David I. Walsh (D)
 2. Frederick H. Gillett (R)

Michigan 
 1. Woodbridge N. Ferris (D), until March 23, 1928
 Arthur H. Vandenberg (R), from March 31, 1928
 2. James J. Couzens (R)

Minnesota 
 1. Henrik Shipstead (FL)
 2. Thomas D. Schall (R)

Mississippi 
 1. Hubert D. Stephens (D)
 2. Pat Harrison (D)

Missouri 
 1. James A. Reed (D)
 3. Harry B. Hawes (D)

Montana 
 1. Burton K. Wheeler (D)
 2. Thomas J. Walsh (D)

Nebraska 
 1. Robert B. Howell (R)
 2. George W. Norris (R)

Nevada 
 1. Key Pittman (D)
 3. Tasker Oddie (R)

New Hampshire 
 2. Henry W. Keyes (R)
 3. George H. Moses (R)

New Jersey 
 1. Edward I. Edwards (D)
 2. Walter E. Edge (R)

New Mexico 
 1. Andrieus A. Jones (D), until December 20, 1927
 Bronson M. Cutting (R), from December 29, 1927, until December 6, 1928
 Octaviano A. Larrazolo (R), from December 7, 1928
 2. Sam G. Bratton (D)

New York 
 1. Royal S. Copeland (D)
 3. Robert F. Wagner (D)

North Carolina 
 2. Furnifold McL. Simmons (D)
 3. Lee S. Overman (D)

North Dakota 
 1. Lynn Frazier (R-NPL)
 3. Gerald Nye (R)

Ohio 
 1. Simeon D. Fess (R)
 3. Frank B. Willis (R), until March 30, 1928
 Cyrus Locher (D), from April 4, 1928, until December 14, 1928
 Theodore E. Burton (R), from December 15, 1928

Oklahoma 
 2. William B. Pine (R)
 3. Elmer Thomas (D)

Oregon 
 2. Charles L. McNary (R)
 3. Frederick Steiwer (R)

Pennsylvania 
 1. David A. Reed (R)
 3. Vacant

Rhode Island 
 1. Peter G. Gerry (D)
 2. Jesse H. Metcalf (R)

South Carolina 
 2. Coleman L. Blease (D)
 3. Ellison D. Smith (D)

South Dakota 
 2. William H. McMaster (R)
 3. Peter Norbeck (R)

Tennessee 
 1. Kenneth D. McKellar(D)
 2. Lawrence Tyson (D)

Texas 
 1. Earle B. Mayfield (D)
 2. Morris Sheppard (D)

Utah 
 1. William H. King (D)
 3. Reed Smoot (R)

Vermont 
 1. Frank L. Greene (R)
 3. Porter H. Dale (R)

Virginia 
 1. Claude A. Swanson (D)
 2. Carter Glass (D)

Washington 
 1. Clarence Dill (D)
 3. Wesley L. Jones (R)

West Virginia 
 1. Guy D. Goff (R)
 2. Matthew M. Neely (D)

Wisconsin 
 1. Robert M. La Follette Jr. (R)
 3. John J. Blaine (R)

Wyoming 
 1. John B. Kendrick (D)
 2. Francis E. Warren (R)

House of Representatives

Members of the House of Representatives are listed by district.

Alabama 
 . John McDuffie (D)
 . J. Lister Hill (D)
 . Henry B. Steagall (D)
 . Lamar Jeffers (D)
 . William B. Bowling (D), until August 16, 1928
 LaFayette L. Patterson (D), from November 6, 1928
 . William B. Oliver (D)
 . Miles C. Allgood (D)
 . Edward B. Almon (D)
 . George Huddleston (D)
 . William B. Bankhead (D)

Arizona 
 . Lewis W. Douglas (D)

Arkansas 
 . William J. Driver (D)
 . William A. Oldfield (D), until November 19, 1928
 Pearl Peden Oldfield (D), from January 9, 1929
 . John N. Tillman (D)
 . Otis Wingo (D)
 . Heartsill Ragon (D)
 . James B. Reed (D)
 . Tilman B. Parks (D)

California 
 . Clarence F. Lea (D)
 . Harry L. Englebright (R)
 . Charles F. Curry (R)
 . Florence P. Kahn (R)
 . Richard J. Welch (R)
 . Albert E. Carter (R)
 . Henry E. Barbour (R)
 . Arthur M. Free (R)
 . William E. Evans (R)
 . Joe Crail (R)
 . Phil Swing (R)

Colorado 
 . William N. Vaile (R), until July 2, 1927
 S. Harrison White (D), from November 15, 1927
 . Charles B. Timberlake (R)
 . Guy U. Hardy (R)
 . Edward T. Taylor (D)

Connecticut 
 . E. Hart Fenn (R)
 . Richard P. Freeman (R)
 . John Q. Tilson (R)
 . Schuyler Merritt (R)
 . James P. Glynn (R)

Delaware 
 . Robert G. Houston (R)

Florida 
 . Herbert J. Drane (D)
 . Robert A. Green (D)
 . Tom A. Yon (D)
 . William J. Sears (D)

Georgia 
 . Charles G. Edwards (D)
 . Edward E. Cox (D)
 . Charles R. Crisp (D)
 . William C. Wright (D)
 . Leslie J. Steele (D)
 . Samuel Rutherford (D)
 . Malcolm C. Tarver (D)
 . Charles H. Brand (D)
 . Thomas M. Bell (D)
 . Carl Vinson (D)
 . William C. Lankford (D)
 . William W. Larsen (D)

Idaho 
 . Burton L. French (R)
 . Addison T. Smith (R)

Illinois 
 . Henry R. Rathbone (R), until July 15, 1928
 . Richard Yates (R)
 . Martin B. Madden (R), until April 27, 1928
 . Morton D. Hull (R)
 . Elliott W. Sproul (R)
 . Thomas A. Doyle (D)
 . Adolph J. Sabath (D)
 . James T. Igoe (D)
 . M. Alfred Michaelson (R)
 . Stanley H. Kunz (D)
 . Frederick A. Britten (R)
 . Carl R. Chindblom (R)
 . Frank R. Reid (R)
 . John T. Buckbee (R)
 . William R. Johnson (R)
 . John C. Allen (R)
 . Edward J. King (R), until February 17, 1929
 . William E. Hull (R)
 . Homer W. Hall (R)
 . William P. Holaday (R)
 . Charles Adkins (R)
 . Henry T. Rainey (D)
 . J. Earl Major (D)
 . Edward M. Irwin (R)
 . William W. Arnold (D)
 . Thomas S. Williams (R)
 . Edward E. Denison (R)

Indiana 
 . Harry E. Rowbottom (R)
 . Arthur H. Greenwood (D)
 . Frank Gardner (D)
 . Harry C. Canfield (D)
 . Noble J. Johnson (R)
 . Richard N. Elliott (R)
 . Ralph E. Updike (R)
 . Albert Vestal (R)
 . Fred S. Purnell (R)
 . William R. Wood (R)
 . Albert R. Hall (R)
 . David Hogg (R)
 . Andrew J. Hickey (R)

Iowa 
 . William F. Kopp (R)
 . F. Dickinson Letts (R)
 . Thomas J. B. Robinson (R)
 . Gilbert N. Haugen (R)
 . Cyrenus Cole (R)
 . C. William Ramseyer (R)
 . Cassius C. Dowell (R)
 . Lloyd Thurston (R)
 . William R. Green (R), until March 31, 1928
 Earl W. Vincent (R), from June 4, 1928
 . Lester J. Dickinson (R)
 . William D. Boies (R)

Kansas 
 . Daniel R. Anthony Jr. (R)
 . Ulysses S. Guyer (R)
 . William H. Sproul (R)
 . Homer Hoch (R)
 . James G. Strong (R)
 . Hays B. White (R)
 . Clifford R. Hope (R)
 . William A. Ayres (D)

Kentucky 
 . William V. Gregory (D)
 . David H. Kincheloe (D)
 . John W. Moore (D)
 . Henry D. Moorman (D)
 . Maurice Thatcher (R)
 . Orie S. Ware (D)
 . Virgil Chapman (D)
 . Ralph W. E. Gilbert (D)
 . Fred M. Vinson (D)
 . Katherine G. Langley (R)
 . John M. Robsion (R)

Louisiana 
 . James O'Connor (D)
 . J. Zach Spearing (D)
 . Whitmell P. Martin (D)
 . John N. Sandlin (D)
 . Riley J. Wilson (D)
 . Bolivar E. Kemp (D)
 . Ladislas Lazaro (D), until March 30, 1927
 René L. De Rouen (D), from August 23, 1927
 . James B. Aswell (D)

Maine 
 . Carroll L. Beedy (R)
 . Wallace H. White Jr. (R)
 . John E. Nelson (R)
 . Ira G. Hersey (R)

Maryland 
 . T. Alan Goldsborough (D)
 . William P. Cole Jr. (D)
 . Vincent L. Palmisano (D)
 . J. Charles Linthicum (D)
 . Stephen W. Gambrill (D)
 . Frederick N. Zihlman (R)

Massachusetts 
 . Allen T. Treadway (R)
 . Henry L. Bowles (R)
 . Frank H. Foss (R)
 . George R. Stobbs (R)
 . Edith Nourse Rogers (R)
 . A. Piatt Andrew Jr. (R)
 . William P. Connery Jr. (D)
 . Frederick W. Dallinger (R)
 . Charles L. Underhill (R)
 . John J. Douglass (D)
 . George H. Tinkham (R)
 . James A. Gallivan (D), until April 3, 1928
 John W. McCormack (D), from November 6, 1928
 . Robert Luce (R)
 . Louis A. Frothingham (R), until August 23, 1928
 Richard B. Wigglesworth (R), from November 6, 1928
 . Joseph W. Martin Jr. (R)
 . Charles L. Gifford (R)

Michigan 
 . Robert H. Clancy (R)
 . Earl C. Michener (R)
 . Joseph L. Hooper (R)
 . John C. Ketcham (R)
 . Carl E. Mapes (R)
 . Grant M. Hudson (R)
 . Louis C. Cramton (R)
 . Bird J. Vincent (R)
 . James C. McLaughlin (R)
 . Roy O. Woodruff (R)
 . Frank P. Bohn (R)
 . W. Frank James (R)
 . Clarence J. McLeod (R)

Minnesota 
 . Allen J. Furlow (R)
 . Frank Clague (R)
 . August H. Andresen (R)
 . Melvin Maas (R)
 . Walter Newton (R)
 . Harold Knutson (R)
 . Ole J. Kvale (FL)
 . William L. Carss (FL)
 . Conrad Selvig (R)
 . Godfrey G. Goodwin (R)

Mississippi 
 . John E. Rankin (D)
 . Bill G. Lowrey (D)
 . William M. Whittington (D)
 . T. Jefferson Busby (D)
 . Ross A. Collins (D)
 . T. Webber Wilson (D)
 . Percy Quin (D)
 . James Collier (D)

Missouri 
 . Milton A. Romjue (D)
 . Ralph F. Lozier (D)
 . Jacob L. Milligan (D)
 . Charles L. Faust (R), until December 17, 1928
 David W. Hopkins (R), from February 5, 1929
 . George H. Combs Jr. (D)
 . Clement C. Dickinson (D)
 . Samuel C. Major (D)
 . William L. Nelson (D)
 . Clarence Cannon (D)
 . Henry F. Niedringhaus (R)
 . John J. Cochran (D)
 . Leonidas C. Dyer (R)
 . Clyde Williams (D)
 . James F. Fulbright (D)
 . Joe J. Manlove (R)
 . Thomas L. Rubey (D), until November 2, 1928

Montana 
 . John M. Evans (D)
 . Scott Leavitt (R)

Nebraska 
 . John H. Morehead (D)
 . Willis G. Sears (R)
 . Edgar Howard (D)
 . John N. Norton (D)
 . Ashton C. Shallenberger (D)
 . Robert G. Simmons (R)

Nevada 
 . Samuel S. Arentz (R)

New Hampshire 
 . Fletcher Hale (R)
 . Edward H. Wason (R)

New Jersey 
 . Charles A. Wolverton (R)
 . Isaac Bacharach (R)
 . Harold G. Hoffman (R)
 . Charles A. Eaton (R)
 . Ernest R. Ackerman (R)
 . Randolph Perkins (R)
 . George N. Seger (R)
 . Paul J. Moore (D)
 . Franklin W. Fort (R)
 . Frederick R. Lehlbach (R)
 . Oscar L. Auf der Heide (D)
 . Mary T. Norton (D)

New Mexico 
 . John Morrow (D)

New York 
 . Robert L. Bacon (R)
 . John J. Kindred (D)
 . George W. Lindsay (D)
 . Thomas H. Cullen (D)
 . Loring M. Black Jr. (D)
 . Andrew L. Somers (D)
 . John Quayle (D)
 . Patrick J. Carley (D)
 . David J. O'Connell (D)
 . Emanuel Celler (D)
 . Anning S. Prall (D)
 . Samuel Dickstein (D)
 . Christopher D. Sullivan (D)
 . William I. Sirovich (D)
 . John J. Boylan (D)
 . John J. O'Connor (D)
 . William W. Cohen (D)
 . John F. Carew (D)
 . Sol Bloom (D)
 . Fiorello H. LaGuardia (R)
 . Royal H. Weller (D), until March 1, 1929
 . Anthony J. Griffin (D)
 . Frank Oliver (D)
 . James M. Fitzpatrick (D)
 . J. Mayhew Wainwright (R)
 . Hamilton Fish III (R)
 . Harcourt J. Pratt (R)
 . Parker Corning (D)
 . James S. Parker (R)
 . Frank Crowther (R)
 . Bertrand Snell (R)
 . Thaddeus C. Sweet (R), until May 1, 1928
 Francis D. Culkin (R), from November 6, 1928
 . Frederick M. Davenport (R)
 . John D. Clarke (R)
 . Walter W. Magee (R), until May 25, 1927
 Clarence E. Hancock (R), from November 8, 1927
 . John Taber (R)
 . Gale H. Stalker (R)
 . Meyer Jacobstein (D)
 . Archie D. Sanders (R)
 . S. Wallace Dempsey (R)
 . Clarence MacGregor (R), until December 31, 1928
 . James M. Mead (D)
 . Daniel A. Reed (R)

North Carolina 
 . Lindsay C. Warren (D)
 . John H. Kerr (D)
 . Charles L. Abernethy (D)
 . Edward W. Pou (D)
 . Charles M. Stedman (D)
 . Homer L. Lyon (D)
 . William C. Hammer (D)
 . Robert L. Doughton (D)
 . Alfred L. Bulwinkle (D)
 . Zebulon Weaver (D)

North Dakota 
 . Olger B. Burtness (R)
 . Thomas Hall (R)
 . James H. Sinclair (R)

Ohio 
 . Nicholas Longworth (R)
 . Vacant, until November 7, 1927
 Charles J. Tatgenhorst Jr. (R), from November 8, 1927
 . Roy G. Fitzgerald (R)
 . William T. Fitzgerald (R)
 . Charles J. Thompson (R)
 . Charles C. Kearns (R)
 . Charles Brand (R)
 . Thomas B. Fletcher (D)
 . William W. Chalmers (R)
 . Thomas A. Jenkins (R)
 . Mell G. Underwood (D)
 . John C. Speaks (R)
 . James T. Begg (R)
 . Martin L. Davey (D)
 . C. Ellis Moore (R)
 . John McSweeney (D)
 . William M. Morgan (R)
 . B. Frank Murphy (R)
 . John G. Cooper (R)
 . Charles A. Mooney (D)
 . Robert Crosser (D)
 . Theodore E. Burton (R), until December 15, 1928

Oklahoma 
 . Everette B. Howard (D)
 . William W. Hastings (D)
 . Wilburn Cartwright (D)
 . Thomas D. McKeown (D)
 . Fletcher B. Swank (D)
 . Jed J. Johnson (D)
 . James V. McClintic (D)
 . Milton C. Garber (R)

Oregon 
 . Willis C. Hawley (R)
 . Nicholas J. Sinnott (R), until May 31, 1928
 Robert R. Butler (R), from November 6, 1928
 . Maurice E. Crumpacker (R), until July 24, 1927
 Franklin F. Korell (R), from October 18, 1927

Pennsylvania 
 . James M. Hazlett (R), until October 20, 1927
 James M. Beck (R), from November 8, 1927
 . George S. Graham (R)
 . Harry C. Ransley (R)
 . Benjamin M. Golder (R)
 . James J. Connolly (R)
 . George A. Welsh (R)
 . George P. Darrow (R)
 . Thomas S. Butler (R), until May 26, 1928
 James Wolfenden (R), from November 6, 1928
 . Henry W. Watson (R)
 . William W. Griest (R)
 . Laurence H. Watres (R)
 . John J. Casey (D)
 . Cyrus M. Palmer (R)
 . Robert G. Bushong (R)
 . Louis T. McFadden (R)
 . Edgar R. Kiess (R)
 . Frederick W. Magrady (R)
 . Edward M. Beers (R)
 . Isaac H. Doutrich (R)
 . James R. Leech (R)
 . J. Banks Kurtz (R)
 . Franklin Menges (R)
 . J. Mitchell Chase (R)
 . Samuel A. Kendall (R)
 . Henry W. Temple (R)
 . J. Howard Swick (R)
 . Nathan L. Strong (R)
 . Thomas C. Cochran (R)
 . Milton W. Shreve (R)
 . Everett Kent (D)
 . Adam M. Wyant (R)
 . Stephen G. Porter (R)
 . M. Clyde Kelly (R)
 . John M. Morin (R)
 . Harry A. Estep (R)
 . Guy E. Campbell (R)

Rhode Island 
 . Clark Burdick (R)
 . Richard S. Aldrich (R)
 . Louis Monast (R)

South Carolina 
 . Thomas S. McMillan (D)
 . Butler B. Hare (D)
 . Frederick H. Dominick (D)
 . John J. McSwain (D)
 . William F. Stevenson (D)
 . Allard H. Gasque (D)
 . Hampton P. Fulmer (D)

South Dakota 
 . Charles A. Christopherson (R)
 . Royal C. Johnson (R)
 . William Williamson (R)

Tennessee 
 . B. Carroll Reece (R)
 . J. Will Taylor (R)
 . Samuel D. McReynolds (D)
 . Cordell Hull (D)
 . Ewin L. Davis (D)
 . Joseph W. Byrns Sr. (D)
 . Edward E. Eslick (D)
 . Gordon Browning (D)
 . Finis J. Garrett (D)
 . Hubert Fisher (D)

Texas 
 . Eugene Black (D)
 . John C. Box (D)
 . Morgan G. Sanders (D)
 . Sam Rayburn (D)
 . Hatton W. Sumners (D)
 . Luther Alexander Johnson (D)
 . Clay Stone Briggs (D)
 . Daniel E. Garrett (D)
 . Joseph J. Mansfield (D)
 . James P. Buchanan (D)
 . Tom Connally (D)
 . Fritz G. Lanham (D)
 . Guinn Williams (D)
 . Harry M. Wurzbach (R)
 . John N. Garner (D)
 . Claude B. Hudspeth (D)
 . Thomas L. Blanton (D)
 . J. Marvin Jones (D)

Utah 
 . Don B. Colton (R)
 . Elmer O. Leatherwood (R)

Vermont 
 . Elbert S. Brigham (R)
 . Ernest Willard Gibson (R)

Virginia 
 . Schuyler Otis Bland (D)
 . Joseph T. Deal (D)
 . Andrew J. Montague (D)
 . Patrick H. Drewry (D)
 . Joseph Whitehead (D)
 . Clifton A. Woodrum (D)
 . Thomas W. Harrison (D)
 . R. Walton Moore (D)
 . George C. Peery (D)
 . Henry St. George Tucker III (D)

Washington 
 . John F. Miller (R)
 . Lindley H. Hadley (R)
 . Albert Johnson (R)
 . John W. Summers (R)
 . Samuel B. Hill (D)

West Virginia 
 . Carl G. Bachmann (R)
 . Frank L. Bowman (R)
 . William S. O'Brien (D)
 . James A. Hughes (R)
 . James F. Strother (R)
 . Edward T. England (R)

Wisconsin 
 . Henry Allen Cooper (R)
 . Charles A. Kading (R)
 . John M. Nelson (R)
 . John C. Schafer (R)
 . Victor L. Berger (S)
 . Florian Lampert (R)
 . Joseph D. Beck (R)
 . Edward E. Browne (R)
 . George J. Schneider (R)
 . James A. Frear (R)
 . Hubert H. Peavey (R)

Wyoming 
 . Charles E. Winter (R)

Non-voting members 
 . Daniel Sutherland (R)
 . Victor S. K. Houston (R)
 . Isauro Gabaldon (Nac.), until July 16, 1928
 . Pedro Guevara (Nac.)
 . Félix Córdova Dávila

Changes in membership
The count below reflects changes from the beginning of the first session of this Congress.

Senate 

|-
| Pennsylvania(3)
| Vacant
| Election of William S. Vare was not certified by the governor and the Senate refused to seat him.
| Vacant
| Seat remained vacant until the next Congress.

|-
| Illinois(3)
| Vacant
| Senator-elect Frank L. Smith was not permitted to qualify and resigned February 9, 1928.Successor elected November 6, 1928.
| nowrap  | Otis F. Glenn (R)
| December 3, 1928

|-
| New Mexico(1)
|  | Andrieus A. Jones (D)
| Died December 20, 1927.Successor appointed December 29, 1927.Successor was later not elected to finish the term, see below.
|  | Bronson M. Cutting (R)
| December 29, 1927

|-
| Michigan(1)
|  | Woodbridge N. Ferris (D)
| Died March 23, 1928.Successor appointed March 31, 1928.Successor was then elected November 6, 1928, to finish the term.
|  | Arthur H. Vandenberg (R)
| March 31, 1928

|-
| Ohio(3)
|  | Frank B. Willis (R)
| Died March 30, 1928.Successor appointed April 4, 1928.Successor was later not elected to finish the term, see below.
|  | Cyrus Locher (D)
| April 4, 1928

|-
| Idaho(3)
| nowrap  | Frank R. Gooding (R)
| Died June 24, 1928.Successor was appointed to continue the term.Successor was then elected November 6, 1928, to finish the term.
| nowrap  | John W. Thomas (R)
| June 30, 1928

|-
| New Mexico(1)
|  | Bronson M. Cutting (R)
| Appointee did not run to finish the term.Successor elected November 6, 1928.
|  | Octaviano A. Larrazolo (R)
| December 7, 1928

|-
| Ohio(3)
|  | Cyrus Locher (D)
| Appointee lost nomination to finish term.Successor elected November 6, 1928.
|  | Theodore E. Burton (R)
| December 15, 1928

|-
| Delaware(2)
|  | T. Coleman du Pont (R)
| Resigned December 9, 1928.Successor appointed December 10, 1928, to finish the term.
| nowrap  | Daniel O. Hastings (R)
| December 10, 1928

|}

House of Representatives 
 Replacements: 15
 Democratic: 1 seat net gain
 Republican: 1 seat net loss
 Deaths: 16
 Resignations: 7
 Total seats with changes: 23

Committees

Senate

 Agriculture and Forestry (Chairman: Charles L. McNary; Ranking Member: Ellison D. Smith)
 Appropriations (Chairman: Francis E. Warren; Ranking Member: Lee S. Overman)
 Audit and Control the Contingent Expenses of the Senate (Chairman: Charles S. Deneen; Ranking Member: Kenneth McKellar)
 Banking and Currency (Chairman: Peter Norbeck; Ranking Member: Duncan U. Fletcher)
 Civil Service (Chairman: Porter H. Dale; Ranking Member: Kenneth McKellar)
 Claims (Chairman: Robert B. Howell; Ranking Member: Park Trammell)
 Commerce (Chairman: Wesley L. Jones; Ranking Member: Duncan U. Fletcher)
 District of Columbia (Chairman: Arthur Capper; Ranking Member: William H. King)
 Education and Labor (Chairman: James Couzens; Ranking Member: Andrieus A. Jones)
 Enrolled Bills (Chairman: Frank L. Greene; Ranking Member: Coleman L. Blease)
 Expenditures in Executive Departments (Chairman: Frederic M. Sackett; Ranking Member: Claude A. Swanson)
 Finance (Chairman: Reed Smoot; Ranking Member: Furnifold M. Simmons)
 Foreign Relations (Chairman: William E. Borah; Ranking Member: Claude A. Swanson)
 Illegal Appointments in Civil Service (Select)
 Immigration (Chairman: Hiram W. Johnson; Ranking Member: William H. King)
 Indian Affairs (Chairman: Lynn J. Frazier; Ranking Member: Henry F. Ashurst)  
 Interoceanic Canals (Chairman: Walter Evans Edge; Ranking Member: Thomas J. Walsh)
 Interstate Commerce (Chairman: James Eli Watson; Ranking Member: Ellison D. Smith)
 Irrigation and Reclamation (Chairman: Lawrence C. Phipps; Ranking Member: Morris Sheppard)
 Judiciary (Chairman: George W. Norris; Ranking Member: Lee S. Overman)
 Library (Chairman: Simeon D. Fess; Ranking Member: Kenneth McKellar)
 Manufactures (Chairman: George P. McLean; Ranking Member: Ellison D. Smith)
 Mexican Propaganda (Select)
 Military Affairs (Chairman: David A. Reed; Ranking Member: Duncan U. Fletcher)
 Mines and Mining (Chairman: Tasker L. Oddie; Ranking Member: Thomas J. Walsh)
 Naval Affairs (Chairman: Frederick Hale; Ranking Member: Claude A. Swanson)
 Patents (Chairman: Jesse H. Metcalf; Ranking Member: Ellison D. Smith)
 Pensions (Chairman: Arthur R. Robinson; Ranking Member: Peter Gerry)
 Post Office and Post Roads (Chairman: George H. Moses; Ranking Member: Kenneth McKellar)
 Presidential Campaign Expenditures (Special)
 Printing (Chairman: Hiram Bingham; Ranking Member: Duncan U. Fletcher)
 Privileges and Elections (Chairman: Samuel M. Shortridge; Ranking Member: William H. King)
 Propaganda or Money Alleged Used by Foreign Governments (Special)
 Public Buildings and Grounds (Chairman: Henry W. Keyes; Ranking Member: James A. Reed)
 Public Lands and Surveys (Chairman: Gerald P. Nye; Ranking Member: Key Pittman)
 Rules (Chairman: Charles Curtis; Ranking Member: Lee S. Overman)
 Senatorial Elections (Select)
 Tariff Commission (Select)
 Territories and Insular Possessions (Chairman: Frank B. Willis; Ranking Member: Key Pittman)
 Whole

House of Representatives

 Accounts (Chairman: Clarence MacGregor; Ranking Member: Ralph Waldo Emerson Gilbert)
 Agriculture (Chairman: Gilbert N. Haugen; Ranking Member: James B. Aswell)
 Alcoholic Liquor Traffic 
 Appropriations (Chairman: Martin B. Madden; Ranking Member: Joseph W. Byrns)
 Banking and Currency (Chairman: Louis T. McFadden; Ranking Member: Otis Wingo)
 Census (Chairman: E. Hart Fenn; Ranking Member: John E. Rankin)
 Civil Service (Chairman: Frederick R. Lehlbach; Ranking Member: John C. Box)
 Claims (Chairman: Charles L. Underhill; Ranking Member: Lamar Jeffers)
 Coinage, Weights and Measures (Chairman: Randolph Perkins; Ranking Member: Bill G. Lowrey)
 Disposition of Executive Papers (Chairman: Edward H. Wason; Ranking Member: Robert A. Green)
 District of Columbia (Chairman: Frederick N. Zihlman; Ranking Member: Christopher D. Sullivan)
 Education (Chairman: Daniel A. Reed; Ranking Member: Bill G. Lowrey)
 Election of the President, Vice President and Representatives in Congress (Chairman: Hays B. White; Ranking Member: Lamar Jeffers)
 Elections No.#1 (Chairman: Don B. Colton; Ranking Member: Edward Eslick)
 Elections No.#2 (Chairman: Bird J. Vincent; Ranking Member: Gordon Browning)
 Elections No.#3 (Chairman: Charles L. Gifford; Ranking Member: Guinn Williams)
 Enrolled Bills (Chairman: Guy E. Campbell; Ranking Member: Thomas L. Blanton)
 Expenditures in the Executive Departments (Chairman: William Williamson; Ranking Member: Fritz G. Lanham)
 Flood Control (Chairman: Frank R. Reid; Ranking Member: Riley J. Wilson)
 Foreign Affairs (Chairman: Stephen G. Porter; Ranking Member: J. Charles Linthicum)
 Immigration and Naturalization (Chairman: Albert W. Johnson; Ranking Member: Adolph J. Sabath)
 Indian Affairs (Chairman: Scott Leavitt; Ranking Member: William J. Sears)
 Insular Affairs (Chairman: Edgar R. Kiess; Ranking Member: Christopher D. Sullivan)
 Interstate and Foreign Commerce (Chairman: James S. Parker; Ranking Member: Sam Rayburn)
 Invalid Pensions (Chairman: William T. Fitzgerald; Ranking Member: Mell G. Underwood)
 Irrigation and Reclamation (Chairman: Addison T. Smith; Ranking Member: C.B. Hudspeth)
 Judiciary (Chairman: George S. Graham; Ranking Member: Hatton W. Sumners)
 Labor (Chairman: William F. Kopp; Ranking Member: William P. Connery Jr.)
 Library (Chairman: Robert Luce; Ranking Member: Ralph Waldo Emerson Gilbert)
 Merchant Marine and Fisheries (Chairman: Wallace H. White Jr.; Ranking Member: Ewin L. Davis)
 Military Affairs (Chairman: John M. Morin; Ranking Member: Percy E. Quin)
 Mines and Mining (Chairman: John M. Robsion; Ranking Member: Arthur H. Greenwood)
 Naval Affairs (Chairman: Thomas S. Butler; Ranking Member: Carl Vinson)
 Patents (Chairman: Albert H. Vestal; Ranking Member: Fritz G. Lanham)
 Pensions (Chairman: Harold Knutson; Ranking Member: William C. Hammer)
 Post Office and Post Roads (Chairman: William W. Griest; Ranking Member: Thomas M. Bell)
 Printing (Chairman: Edward M. Beers; Ranking Member: William F. Stevenson)
 Public Buildings and Grounds (Chairman: Richard N. Elliott; Ranking Member: Fritz G. Lanham)
 Public Lands (Chairman: Nicholas J. Sinnott; Ranking Member: John M. Evans)
 Revision of Laws (Chairman: Roy G. Fitzgerald; Ranking Member: Alfred L. Bulwinkle)
 Rivers and Harbors (Chairman: S. Wallace Dempsey; Ranking Member: Joseph J. Mansfield)
 Roads (Chairman: Cassius C. Dowell; Ranking Member: Edward B. Almon)
 Rules (Chairman: Bertrand H. Snell; Ranking Member: Edward W. Pou)
 Standards of Official Conduct
 Territories (Chairman: Charles F. Curry; Ranking Member: William C. Lankford)
 War Claims (Chairman: James G. Strong; Ranking Member: Bill G. Lowrey)
 Ways and Means (Chairman: William R. Green; Ranking Member: John N. Garner)
 World War Veterans' Legislation (Chairman: Royal C. Johnson; Ranking Member: Alfred L. Bulwinkle)
 Whole

Joint committees

 Conditions of Indian Tribes (Special)
 Disposition of (Useless) Executive Papers
 Harriman Geographic Code System
 Investigation of Northern Pacific Railroad Land Grants
 Determine what Employment may be Furnished Federal Prisoners (Chairman: Rep. George S. Graham)
 Investigate Northern Pacific Lands (Chairman: Rep. Nicholas J. Sinnott)
 The Library (Chairman: Sen. Simeon D. Fess)
 Printing (Chairman: Sen. George H. Moses)
 Taxation (Chairman: Rep. William R. Green)
 To Investigate the Salaries of Officers and Employees of the Senate and the House

Caucuses
 Democratic (House)
 Democratic (Senate)

Officers

Legislative branch agency directors
 Architect of the Capitol: David Lynn
 Attending Physician of the United States Congress: George Calver, from 1928
 Comptroller General of the United States: John R. McCarl
 Librarian of Congress: Herbert Putnam 
 Public Printer of the United States: George H. Carter

Senate 
 Chaplain: John J. Muir, (Baptist), until December 5, 1927
 ZeBarney T. Phillips (Episcopal), from December 5, 1927
 Secretary: Edwin P. Thayer
 Librarian: Edward C. Goodwin
 Sergeant at Arms: David S. Barry

House of Representatives 
 Chaplain: James S. Montgomery (Methodist)
 Clerk: William T. Page
 Doorkeeper: Bert W. Kennedy
 Reading Clerks: Patrick Joseph Haltigan (D) and Alney E. Chaffee (R)
 Sergeant at Arms: Joseph G. Rodgers
 Parliamentarian: Lewis Deschler, from 1928
 Postmaster: Frank W. Collier

See also 
 1926 United States elections (elections leading to this Congress)
 1926 United States Senate elections
 1926 United States House of Representatives elections
 1928 United States elections (elections during this Congress, leading to the next Congress)
 1928 United States presidential election
 1928 United States Senate elections
 1928 United States House of Representatives elections

Notes

References

External links
 Biographical Directory of the U.S. Congress
 U.S. House of Representatives: House History
 U.S. Senate: Statistics and Lists